Langate Assembly constituency is one of the 87 constituencies in the Jammu and Kashmir Legislative Assembly of Jammu and Kashmir a north state of India. Langate is also part of Baramulla Lok Sabha constituency.

Member of Legislative Assembly

 1977: Mohammad Sultan Ganai, Jammu & Kashmir National Conference
 1983: Abdul Ahad Wani, Jammu & Kashmir National Conference
 1987: Abdul Ahad Wani, Jammu & Kashmir National Conference
 1996: Abdul Ahad Wani, Jammu & Kashmir National Conference
 1999 (By Polls): Mohammad Sultan Pandit, Jammu & Kashmir People's Democratic Party
 2002: Sharifuddin Shariq, Jammu & Kashmir National Conference
 2008: Engineer Rashid, Independent

Election results

2014

See also
 Langate
 Kupwara district
 List of constituencies of Jammu and Kashmir Legislative Assembly

References

Assembly constituencies of Jammu and Kashmir
Kupwara district